Bedeviled is a 2016 American supernatural horror film directed, written and produced by Abel Vang and Burlee Vang. Starring Saxon Sharbino, Mitchell Edwards, Victory Van Tuyl, Brandon Soo Hoo, Carson Boatman and Alexis G Zall. The film was released on October 22, 2016, at Screamfest LA, and was released in select theaters and on Digital HD on August 11, 2017.

Plot
The film opens with the death of Nikki, a young woman that recently downloaded Mr. Bedevil, a mysterious Siri-like A.I. app. She's stalked by a paranormal presence and is later found dead from a shock-induced heart attack. Following her funeral, Nikki's boyfriend, Cody, and best friend, Alice, along with Alice's boyfriend, Gavin, and friends, Haley and Dan, all receive invites to download Mr. Bedevil. They decide to download the app, which results in the group getting tormented by Mr. Bedevil and becoming haunted according to their personal fears. They also discover brands on their bodies in the shape of Mr. Bedevil’s app icon and eventually accept that the app is intent on killing them. Trying to destroy their phones will not stop Mr. Bedevil, as their phones will only get restored to their prior state.

The group tries to go to the police with their concerns after the app uploads a sex tape made by Haley and Dan, only for Mr. Bedevil to possess the police, making the application impossible to stop through normal means. As the tension mounts, the app tricks Gavin into coming to Alice's house, where he's murdered by clowns. The remaining friends manage to recover Nikki's phone, through which they discover that Nikki received an invite via Samuel Price, Nikki’s former physics tutor and pseudoscience enthusiast. Alice and Cody go to Sam's house, where they discover his body as well as audiotapes of Sam's research, which identify Mr. Bedevil as a paranormal presence that uses the app to enter reality in a manner similar to an Ouija board. Meanwhile, Haley and Dan are both murdered by Mr. Bedevil in ways that mimic their fears.

Cody discovers that it is possible to uninstall Mr. Bedevil from their phones by writing code that will accomplish this task. Because the app is capable of adapting and rewriting its firmware, Cody can only use his program when Mr. Bedevil enters the physical world by first connecting to the phone’s hardware. Alice and Cody set a trap for Mr. Bedevil at a warehouse using two separate computer stations. They manage to successfully uninstall Mr. Bedevil from Alice's phone but are unable to do the same for Cody's phone, as the second computer station's uninstall program fails to penetrate the additional security on his phone, resulting in Cody's death. The film ends with Alice attending college and FaceTiming her mother, only to discover that she is now using the Mr. Bedevil app herself.

Cast

 Saxon Sharbino as Alice
 Mitchell Edwards as Cody
 Brandon Soo Hoo as Dan
 Victory Van Tuyl as Haley
 Carson Boatman as Gavin
 Jordan Essoe as Mr. Bedevil
 Alexis G. Zall as Nikki
 Robyn Cohen as Alice's Mom
 Kate Orsini as Nikki's Mom
 Bonnie Morgan as Grandmother
 Aaron Hendry as Mr. DiFilipo
 Linda Barrett as Lady on Bus
 Doug Scarbrough as Homeless Man
 Robert John Brewer as Voice of Homeless Man
 Shannon Sinclear as Bedeviled Lady
 Belle Vang as Young Dan / Young Haley
 Carr Carzouapa Lee as Drowned Woman
 Kevin Cheng Vang as Haley's Father
 Cole Duran as Teddy Bear Voice
 Brett Wagner as Fat Clown
 Camden Toy as Tall Clown
 Angelina Armani as Maid Clown
 Michael Shen as Detective
 Billy Mayo as Cop
 Matty Finochio as Samuel Price

Reception

Bloody Disgusting rated Bedeviled three and a half out of a possible five stars, stating that "What we have here is a charming, albeit occasionally predictable, character-driven horror movie with a splash of modern sensibilities."

References

External links
 

2016 films
2016 horror films
2010s supernatural horror films
2010s teen horror films
American supernatural horror films
American teen horror films
Demons in film
Films shot in California
Films about the Internet
American exploitation films
2010s English-language films
2010s American films